Laurence Bergreen (born February 4, 1950 in New York City) is an American historian and author.

Career
After graduating from Harvard University in 1972, Bergreen worked in journalism, academia and broadcasting before publishing his first biography, James Agee: A Life.

Bergreen has written books on historical subjects, such as Voyage to Mars: NASA's Search for Life Beyond Earth, a narrative of NASA's exploration of Mars, and Over the Edge of the World: Magellan's Terrifying Circumnavigation of the Globe. Bergreen's biography, Marco Polo: From Venice to Xanadu, is being developed into a feature film starring Matt Damon.

Bergreen has written for The New York Times, Los Angeles Times, The Wall Street Journal, Chicago Tribune, Newsweek and Esquire. He has taught at the New School for Social Research and served as Assistant to the President of the Museum of Television and Radio in New York. In 1995, he served as a judge for the National Book Awards and in 1991 as a judge for the PEN/Albrand Nonfiction Award. A frequent lecturer at major universities and symposiums, and, on occasion, aboard cruise ships, he has served as a Featured Historian for the History Channel.

In 2007, Bergreen was asked by NASA to name some geological features surrounding the Victoria crater on Mars, based on places Ferdinand Magellan visited. In 2008, Bergreen was a keynote speaker at NASA's 50th anniversary event in Washington, D.C. His most recent work is Casanova: The World of a Seductive Genius.

Bergreen is a member of PEN American Center, The Explorers Club, the Authors Guild, and the Board of Trustees of the New York Society Library. He currently lives in New York City.

Personal life
Laurence Bergreen is married to Jacqueline Philomeno, from Brazil. He is the father of two children from his first marriage, Nicholas Bergreen (born in 1982) and Sara Bergreen (born in 1984). Also, Jacqueline Philomeno is the mother of Nicholas David (born in 2003).

Works
Bergreen's first book was Look Now, Pay Later: The Rise of Network Broadcasting, published in 1980. His biography, James Agee: A Life, was a New York Times “Notable Book” for 1984. As Thousands Cheer: The Life of Irving Berlin, appeared in 1990. It won the Ralph J. Gleason Music Book Award and the ASCAP-Deems Taylor award; it was also a New York Times "Notable Book" for 1990.

In 1994, he published Capone: The Man and the Era. A Book-of-the-Month Club selection and a New York Times "Notable Book", it has been optioned by Miramax. In 1997, Bergreen published Louis Armstrong: An Extravagant Life, a biography drawing on unpublished manuscripts and interviews with Armstrong's colleagues and friends. It appeared on the “Best Books of 1997” lists of the San Francisco Chronicle, the Philadelphia Inquirer, and Publishers Weekly.

Bergreen is the author of Voyage to Mars: NASA’s Search for Life Beyond Earth, a narrative of NASA's exploration of Mars, published in November 2000. Dramatic rights were acquired by TNT.

His next work, Over the Edge of the World: Magellan’s Terrifying Circumnavigation of the Globe, was published in October 2003. A New York Times "Notable Book" for 2003, it is also in development as a motion picture.

In October 2007, Bergreen published Marco Polo: From Venice to Xanadu, a biography of the iconic traveler. Warner Brothers is developing a feature film based on this book starring Matt Damon and written by William Monahan.

His 2011 book is Columbus: The Four Voyages, a New York Times bestseller. It was a selection of the Book-of-the-Month Club, BOMC2, the History Book Club, and the Military Book Club, and was a New York Times Book Review "Editors Choice".

In 2016, he published Casanova: The World of a Seductive Genius, available from Simon & Schuster.

In May 2017, Roaring Brook Press, a division of Macmillan, published his first Young Adult book, Magellan: Over the Edge of the World, an adaptation of his international bestseller. 

His most recent adult book is the highly acclaimed In Search of a Kingdom: Francis Drake, Elizabeth I, and the Perilous Birth of the British Empire, available from HarperCollins Publishers in March 2021.

Bibliography
 Look Now, Pay Later: The Rise of Network Broadcasting (1980) 
 James Agee: A Life (1984) 
 As Thousands Cheer: The Life of Irving Berlin (1990) 
 Capone: The Man and the Era (1994) 
 Louis Armstrong: An Extravagant Life (1997) 
 Voyage to Mars: NASA's Search for Life Beyond Earth (2000) 
 The Quest for Mars: NASA Scientists and Their Search for Life Beyond Earth (2000)  (hdc) (2001)  (pbk)
 Over the Edge of the World: Magellan's Terrifying Circumnavigation of the Globe (2003) 
 Marco Polo: From Venice to Xanadu (2007) 
 Columbus: The Four Voyages (2011) 
 Casanova: The World of a Seductive Genius (2016) 
 Magellan: Over the Edge of the World, Young Adult Edition (2017) 
In Search of a Kingdom: Francis Drake, Elizabeth I, and the Perilous Birth of the British Empire (2021) 
Seven Voyages: How China's Treasure Fleet Conquered the Sea, with Sara Fray (2021)

Awards
 Winner, ASCAP-Deems Taylor Award for Excellence in Music Journalism, 1990 for As Thousands Cheer
 First place, Ralph J. Gleason Music Book Award, 1991
 Medalla de Honor by the Asociación de Alcades de V Centenario (Spain) for Over the Edge of the World

References

External links
 
 Laurence Bergreen at Library of Congress Authorities – with 12 catalog records
 

American biographers
1950 births
American male biographers
20th-century American Jews
American science writers
Taft School alumni
Harvard University alumni
Living people
People from New York City
21st-century American historians
21st-century American male writers
American male non-fiction writers
21st-century American Jews